Paul Burney Johnson Sr. (March 23, 1880December 26, 1943) was an American attorney, judge, and politician, serving as United States Representative from Mississippi, 1919–1923, and as Governor of Mississippi, 1940–1943.

Early career
From 1907 to 1908 Johnson served as a judge of the city court of Hattiesburg, Mississippi. Two years later he became circuit judge of the 12th judicial district, with his tenure ending in 1919.

Congress
In 1918 Johnson was elected to the U.S. House of Representatives as a Democrat, serving from 1919 to 1923. During this period, he developed a friendship with Franklin D. Roosevelt, Assistant Secretary of Navy and future President of the United States, and his family. Their children played together.

In 1939, Johnson won the race for Governor of Mississippi.  He died in office in 1943. His son, Paul B. Johnson Jr., was serving in the Marines in the Pacific during World War II at the time. More than 20 years later, he was elected as governor in 1964. His grandson, Pete Johnson, was elected state Auditor in 1988.

Paul B. Johnson State Park, a state park in Mississippi, is named after him.

References

External links
 
 

1880 births
1943 deaths
Mississippi state court judges
Democratic Party governors of Mississippi
People from Hattiesburg, Mississippi
Democratic Party members of the United States House of Representatives from Mississippi
20th-century American judges
People from Scott County, Mississippi
20th-century American politicians